Calgary-Acadia is a current provincial electoral district in Calgary, Alberta, Canada. Created in 2010, the district is one of 87 districts mandated to return a single member (MLA) to the Legislative Assembly of Alberta using the first past the post method of voting.

History
The Calgary-Acadia electoral district was created in the 2010 Alberta boundary re-distribution. It was created primarily from the old electoral district of Calgary-Egmont and a portion of Calgary-Glenmore. Egmont also had some other areas redistributed to Glenmore and Calgary-Fort. When created in 2010, the Calgary-Acadia electoral district would have a population of 37,718, which was 7.7% below the provincial average of 40,880.

Minor adjustments to the district occurred in the 2017 electoral boundaries re-distribution, the district would be reunited with North Glenmore Park, and three communities belonging to the same community association and equalizing variances to a degree among the constituencies of Calgary-Acadia, Calgary-Elbow and Calgary-Glenmore. In the result, the Chinook Park community would be moved out of Calgary-Acadia and into Calgary-Glenmore. Further, Bow River would no longer bisect the constituency and, instead, would largely form its eastern boundary. The boundaries as adjusted would give the electoral district a population of 48,966 in 2017, 5% above the provincial average of 46,803.

Boundary history

Representation history

The Calgary-Acadia electoral district would elect the incumbent from the abolished Calgary-Egmont electoral district, Progressive Conservative Jonathan Denis in the 2012 Alberta general election. Denis would defeat his closest opponent Wildrose candidate Richard Jones by 555 votes.  Denis had previously served as the Minister of Housing and Urban Affairs from 2010 to 2011, and Solicitor General and Minister of Public Security from 2011-2012. Following the 2012 election Dennis would be appointed Minister of Justice, Attorney General and Solicitor General. Denis would hold the position until April 2015, when he would resign after being sued by his estranged wife on false allegations of abuse. The Court of Queen's Bench would ultimately find the allegations unfounded in February 2019 and that Palmer "lied to the Court under oath" with the intent of defrauding Denis out of $1,000,000.00.

The 2015 Alberta general election would see NDP candidate Brandy Payne defeat PC incumbent Jonathan Denis and Wildrose candidate Linda Carlson as part of the "Orange Crush" which saw the 40 year Progressive Conservative dynasty end, and the NDP party form government in Alberta. The incumbent Jonathan Denis would finish third. Payne would win the election despite spending only $240 during the campaign, well under Denis' total of $79,171.

Prior to the 2019 Alberta general election, incumbent Brandy Payne would announce she would not be seeking re-election, and instead would spend more time with her family. United Conservative Party of Alberta candidate Tyler Shandro would go on to defeat NDP candidate Kate Andrews by 4,567 votes. Shandro would be appointed Minister of Health by Premier Jason Kenney.

Elections

2012 general election

2015 general election

2019 general election

Senate nominee results

2012 Senate nominee election district results

Student vote results

2012 election

See also
List of Alberta provincial electoral districts

References

External links
Elections Alberta
The Legislative Assembly of Alberta

Alberta provincial electoral districts
Politics of Calgary